The End: Live in Birmingham is a live album by English heavy metal band Black Sabbath. It features the final performance from their farewell concert tour, known as The End Tour, recorded in Birmingham, England, on 4 February 2017. Performing at the show and on the album are founding Black Sabbath members Ozzy Osbourne, Tony Iommi, and Geezer Butler. They performed with session drummer Tommy Clufetos filling in for the band's original drummer, Bill Ward, as well as keyboardist and guitarist Adam Wakeman.

The End: Live in Birmingham was released on 17 November 2017, preceded by a concert film, Black Sabbath: The End of the End, which was released on 28 September. The album was released through Eagle Vision, as a CD, DVD, Blu-ray, vinyl record and a limited deluxe box set.

Background

The film documents the final Black Sabbath show, held at the Genting Arena in the band's hometown of Birmingham, England, on 4 February 2017.

In addition to the live concert, both the film and album feature "The Angelic Sessions" – five songs recorded in the days following the band's final show. The tracks will mark the band's final studio recordings.

Tracklist
All songs written by Geezer Butler, Tony Iommi, Ozzy Osbourne and Bill Ward.

"The Angelic Sessions"

Personnel
Black Sabbath
 Tony Iommi – guitars
 Geezer Butler – bass 
 Ozzy Osbourne – vocals

Additional musicians
 Adam Wakeman – keyboards
 Tommy Clufetos – drums

Production
 Mike Exeter – mixing, mastering

Charts

Album charts

Video charts

Certifications

References

2017 live albums
Black Sabbath live albums